Kaleidosport is a Canadian sports television series which aired on CBC Television from 1967 to 1972.

Premise
Lloyd Robertson hosted this series which presented various sports events. Its first broadcasts featured summary coverage of the 1967 Canada Winter Games from Quebec City. Each episode could include multiple different sporting events.

Scheduling
This one- to two-hour series was broadcast as follows:

See also
 Wide World of Sports

References

External links
 

CBC Television original programming
1967 Canadian television series debuts
1972 Canadian television series endings